Pattarawadee Laosa (born 15 November 1998), nicknamed Tungpang, is a Thai television actress. She is best known for her lead roles acting in the series The Legend of King Naresuan: The Series (2016)

Biography 
Pattarawadee was born on November 15, 1988 in  Bangkok, Thailand, She started her career in the Year 3 by scouting for various jobs. Then came the contest to hunt for new gangs. She also played the series BeeTalk (BeeTalk), as well as sitcoms. Nong Mai Rai Borisuth and then have a fashion shoot. Show short films come on. Until she came into the company. Mono's Got Talent because she won in 2014 Gossip Girl contest. She sign with Mono for 2 years until he had the opportunity to join the casting and play in The Legend of King Naresuan: The Series And now she started to sing seriously. And it was talked to the productions to make music with the mono 29 company.

Film
 Sweet Secret (2021) as Yogurt

Television series

Music Video
 Huo Jai Mai Pid Nha Thang (2561)

References

External links 

1998 births
Living people
Pattaravadee Laosa
Pattaravadee Laosa
Pattaravadee Laosa